Richaun Diante Holmes (born October 15, 1993) is an American professional basketball player for the Sacramento Kings of the National Basketball Association (NBA). He played college basketball for the Bowling Green Falcons where he was named to multiple All-Mid-American Conference teams. Holmes previously played for the 76ers for 3 seasons before being traded to the Suns in the 2018 offseason. He played his only season with the Suns before signing with the Kings in the 2019 offseason.

High school and college career
Holmes is the son of two Doctors of Divinity who run a Chicago-area church. In high school, Holmes grew from a 6'2" guard into a 6'9" forward, but did not receive any Division I college basketball scholarship offers until he had already committed to playing for Moraine Valley Community College.

In his only season at Moraine Valley, Holmes averaged 19.3 points, 9.3 rebounds and 5.2 blocks per game. After earning junior college All-American honors, Holmes transferred to Bowling Green.

In his sophomore season at Bowling Green, Holmes averaged 6.5 points, 5.0 rebounds and 2.3 blocks per game. He doubled his scoring numbers while contributing 7.7 rebounds and 2.5 blocks per game as a junior. With the hiring of coach Chris Jans, Holmes worked on improving every aspect of his game and adding a three-point shot, sometimes taking 1,000 shots a day in practice. The end result was averages of 14.7 points, 8.0 rebounds and 2.7 blocks per game as a senior and shooting percentages of 56.3% on field goals and 41.9% on three-pointers. In Holmes' senior year, Bowling Green improved to 21–12 from a 12-win season the year prior, while also reaching the CollegeInsider.com Tournament.

Professional career

Philadelphia 76ers (2015–2018)
On June 25, 2015, Holmes was selected with the 37th overall pick in the 2015 NBA draft by the Philadelphia 76ers. On July 31, 2015, he signed with the 76ers after averaging 10 points and five rebounds in three summer league games for the team. On November 9, 2015, he received his first career start, scoring a then season-high 11 points in a loss to the Chicago Bulls. He topped that mark on December 10, 2015 with 14 points against the San Antonio Spurs. On December 28, 2015, he set a new season-high with 18 points in a 95–91 loss to the Utah Jazz.

In July 2016, Holmes re-joined the 76ers for the 2016 NBA Summer League. In January 2017, he was assigned three times to the Delaware 87ers of the NBA Development League. He became a fixture in the Sixers' rotation in February 2017 following the Nerlens Noel trade, the prolonged injury to Joel Embiid, and Holmes outplaying Jahlil Okafor. On February 24, 2017, he had 12 points, 10 rebounds and five blocks to help the depleted 76ers defeat the Washington Wizards 120–112. On March 20, 2017, he tied a career high in points with 24 and established a career best in rebounds with 14 in a 112–109 overtime loss to the Orlando Magic. Nine days later, he set a new career high with 25 points in a 99–92 loss to the Atlanta Hawks.

On October 8, 2017, Holmes was ruled out for approximately three weeks after being diagnosed with a non-displaced fracture in the radial bone of his left wrist. On June 13, 2018, the 76ers announced they had exercised the fourth-year option on their contract with Holmes.

Phoenix Suns (2018–2019)
On July 20, 2018, Holmes was traded to the Phoenix Suns in exchange for cash considerations. On November 6, he had season highs of 13 points and 10 rebounds in a 104–82 loss to the Brooklyn Nets. Holmes later recorded a new season high of 19 points in a 123–119 overtime loss to the Los Angeles Clippers on December 10. Holmes also recorded a double-double of 12 points and a new season-high of 11 rebounds on March 15, 2019 during only 16 minutes of play in a 108–102 loss to the Houston Rockets.

Sacramento Kings (2019–present) 
On July 16, 2019, Holmes signed a two-year contract, worth $10 million, with the Sacramento Kings.

On August 6, 2021, Holmes re-signed with the Kings on a 4-year, $55 million contract. On March 18, 2022, he was ruled out for the remainder of the season due to personal issues.

NBA career statistics

Regular season

|-
| style="text-align:left;"| 
| style="text-align:left;"| Philadelphia
| 51 || 1 || 13.8 || .514 || .182 || .689 || 2.6 || .6 || .4 || .8 || 5.6
|-
| style="text-align:left;"| 
| style="text-align:left;"| Philadelphia
| 57 || 17 || 20.9 || .558 || .351 || .699 || 5.5 || 1.0 || .7 || 1.0 || 9.8
|-
| style="text-align:left;"| 
| style="text-align:left;"| Philadelphia
| 48 || 2 || 15.5 || .560 || .129 || .661 || 4.4 || 1.3 || .4 || .6 || 6.5
|-
| style="text-align:left;"| 
| style="text-align:left;"| Phoenix
| 70 || 4 || 16.9 || .608 || — || .731 || 4.7 || .9 || .6 || 1.1 || 8.2
|-
| style="text-align:left;"| 
| style="text-align:left;"| Sacramento
| 44 || 38 || 28.2 || .648 || — || .788 || 8.1 || 1.0 || .9 || 1.3 || 12.3
|-
| style="text-align:left;"| 
| style="text-align:left;"| Sacramento
| 61 || 61 || 29.2 || .637 || .182 || .794 || 8.3 || 1.7 || .6 || 1.6 || 14.2
|-
| style="text-align:left;"| 
| style="text-align:left;"| Sacramento
| 45 || 37 || 23.9 || .660 || .400 || .778 || 7.0 || 1.1 || .4 || .9 || 10.4
|- class="sortbottom"
| style="text-align:center;" colspan="2"| Career
| 376 || 160 || 21.1 || .605 || .256 || .746 || 5.8 || 1.1 || .6 || 1.1 || 9.6

Playoffs 

|-
| style="text-align:left;"| 2018
| style="text-align:left;"| Philadelphia
| 3 || 0 || 3.7 || .000 || — || — || .3 || .3 || .0 || .0 || .0
|- class"sortbottom"
| style="text-align:center;" colspan="2"|Career
| 3 || 0 || 3.7 || .000 || — || — || .3 || .3 || .0 || .0 || .0

References

External links

Bowling Green Falcons bio

1993 births
Living people
African-American basketball players
American men's basketball players
Basketball players from Illinois
Bowling Green Falcons men's basketball players
Centers (basketball)
Delaware 87ers players
Junior college men's basketball players in the United States
People from Lockport, Illinois
Philadelphia 76ers draft picks
Philadelphia 76ers players
Phoenix Suns players
Power forwards (basketball)
Sacramento Kings players
Sportspeople from the Chicago metropolitan area
21st-century African-American sportspeople